Dataplex (stylized as dataplex) is a 2005 album by Japanese sound artist Ryoji Ikeda. It was released in December 2005 by independent record label Raster-Noton on CD.

Background 

Dataplex was Ryoji Ikeda's first full-length release since his 2002's orchestral Op. It is the first part in the Datamatics series, which "interrogates and interprets the mass of raw computer data surrounding us all." Overall, it is the musician's seventh solo album. The last track, "data.adaplex", causes intentional playback errors when played on some CD players.

Reception 

BBC Musics Peter Marsh praised its composition stating the tracks are "arranged with surgical precision into short slices of minimalist art-techno; funky in a very cerebral, molecular sort of fashion, they're immersive (and by track 19) almost lush and strangely beautiful." Comparing it to Autechre, PopMatterss Tim O'Neil found "everything is once again falling apart in the most remarkable fashion. The computer is rebooting."

Reflecting on Datamatics as a series, Dusted Magazines John Seelbach called Dataplex "a surprising and enthralling start". AllMusics Rob Theakston also said it was "a promising start to what could be one of the most ambitious projects of the post-glitch movement." Brainwasheds Jon Whitney revered the album with "rather rhythmic, challenging, and completely enjoyable: something most computer musician types have failed at."

Track listing

References

2005 albums
Ryoji Ikeda albums